Moti Sher is a 1987 Pakistani Punjabi language action film, directed by Imtiaz Qureshi and produced by Ashiq Hussain. Film starring actor Sultan Rahi, Mumtaz, Afzaal Ahmed and Ilyas Kashmiri.

Cast
 Moti- A horse's name featured in this film
 Sultan Rahi – Shera
 Mumtaz – (Lover of Shera)
 Afzaal Ahmed – (son of Jageerdar)
 Arifa Siddiqui – sister of Shera
 Shakeela Qureshi
 Tanzeem Hasan
 Bahar – mother of Shera
 Sawan –
 Ilyas Kashmiri – as Jageerdar
 Saleem Hasan – as a son of Jageerdar
 Khawar Butt
 Aachi Khan – another son of Jageerdar
 Hadiar Abbas
 Iqbal Durrani
 Seema
 Firdousi
 Ali Khan – (a child actor)
 Munir Zarif – (comedy actor)

Track list
The music of the film is by musician Wajahat Attre. The film song lyrics were penned by Waris Ludhianvi; the playback singers were Noor Jehan, Naheed Akhtar and Mehnaz.

References

1987 films
Pakistani action films
Punjabi-language Pakistani films
1980s Punjabi-language films
1987 action films